Eric Samuel Blankley (3 June 1910 – 1954) was an English cricketer who played for Assam. He was born in East Ham.

Blankley made a single first-class appearance for the side, during the 1949-50 Ranji Trophy, against Holkar. From the lower-middle order, he scored 2 runs in the first innings in which he batted, and 12 runs in the second. He took figures of 2–53 in the only innings in which he bowled.

External links
Eric Blankley at Cricket Archive 
Eric Blankley at Cricinfo.com

1910 births
1954 deaths
English cricketers
Assam cricketers